General relativity and supergravity in all dimensions meet each other at a common assumption:

Using these assumptions one can construct an effective field theory in low energies for both. In this form the action of general relativity can be written in the form of the Plebanski action which can be constructed using the Palatini action to derive Einstein's field equations of general relativity.

The form of the action introduced by Plebanski is:

where

The specific definition

formally satisfies the Einstein's field equation of general relativity.

Application is to the Barrett–Crane model.

See also

 Tetradic Palatini action
 Barrett–Crane model
 BF model

References

 

Variational formalism of general relativity